Dolichopus ramifer is a species of long-legged fly in the family Dolichopodidae.

References

Further reading

External links

 

ramifer
Taxa named by Hermann Loew
Insects described in 1861